 

Toll Bar is a semi-rural hamlet in the Metropolitan Borough of Doncaster local government area, South Yorkshire, England. Toll Bar had a population of 1,226 in the 2011 census.

On 25 June 2007 the Ea Beck overflowed and flooded the village.

The village school is Toll Bar Primary School. In 2014, about one third of its pupils had a Romany or Gypsy background. The school has been rated as good by Ofsted. Toll Bar also has a post office.

See also
Listed buildings in Doncaster (Bentley Ward)

References

External links
Toll Bar Primary School

Villages in Doncaster
Toll houses